Ralph McKenzie Freeman (May 5, 1902 – March 29, 1990) was a United States district judge of the United States District Court for the Eastern District of Michigan.

Education and career

Born on May 5, 1902, in Flushing, Michigan, Freeman received a Bachelor of Laws in 1926 from University of Michigan Law School. He entered private practice in Flint, Michigan from 1926 to 1927 and again from 1933 to 1954. He was an assistant prosecutor in Genesee County, Michigan from 1928 to 1930 and prosecutor from 1931 to 1932.

Other service

Freeman was elected to the Flint Board of Education in 1935, and served until 1949. During the course of that service, he served in the capacity of Secretary, as Vice President and ultimately as President of the Board for four years. His service was recognized by the Flint Board of Education when they named a new school in Flint, the Ralph M. Freeman Elementary School.

Federal judicial service

Freeman was nominated by President Dwight D. Eisenhower on May 10, 1954, to the United States District Court for the Eastern District of Michigan, to a new seat authorized by 68 Stat. 8. He was confirmed by the United States Senate on June 8, 1954, and received his commission on June 10, 1954. He took the oath and entered on duty on June 29, 1954. He served as a member of the Judicial Conference of the United States from 1963 to 1966 and as Chief Judge from February 18, 1967 to May 4, 1972. He assumed senior status on July 1, 1973. His service terminated on March 29, 1990, due to his death in Royal Oak, Michigan.

Personal and death

On August 13, 1938, Freeman married Emmalyn Ellis; they had no children. Freeman died suddenly on March 29, 1990, after returning from a judicial conference at Hilton Head, South Carolina. He was interred at Sunset Hill Cemetery in Flint after a graveside service.

References

External links
 Bio at the Sixth Circuit website 
 

1902 births
1990 deaths
Burials in Michigan
People from Flint, Michigan
People from Royal Oak, Michigan
University of Michigan Law School alumni
Judges of the United States District Court for the Eastern District of Michigan
United States district court judges appointed by Dwight D. Eisenhower
20th-century American judges